Gunasheela Surgical and Maternity Hospital is a hospital in  Basavanagudi, Bangalore, India, specializing in gynecology. The facility recently won the India Healthcare Award for gynecology.

References

External links
Official website

Hospitals in Bangalore
Year of establishment missing